Kulumindini Band are an aboriginal rock band from Elliott, Northern Territory. They are named after a Jingili dreaming site. The  members are Jingili-Mudbura people and they sing in both Mudbura and English. In 2008 they were inducted into the hall of fame at the NT Indigenous Music Awards.

Discography
Marlinja Music
You're Not Useless (1993)
History (1995)

References

Northern Territory musical groups
Indigenous Australian musical groups